EDR may refer to:

Organisations
 Ems Dollart Region, an INTERREG-IV organisation on the Dutch-German border
 Experimenterende Danske Radioamatører, a Danish amateur radio organization

Science and technology
 Electrodermal response of electrical characteristics of skin
 Electrodialysis reversal desalination process
 Endpoint detection and response for detecting cyber threats
 Enhanced Data Rate
 Bluetooth Enhanced Data Rate
 Equivalence of direct radiation of radiators
 European Drawer Rack, on the International Space Station
 Event data recorder in some automobiles

Transportation
 Edmonton Green railway station (station code), London, England
 Edward River Airport (IATA code), Queensland, Australia
 Emergency Detour Route, originally Emergency Diversion Routes, Ontario, Canada
 Fly All Ways (ICAO airline designator), a Surinamese airline

Other uses
 Eastern Development Region, Nepal, one of the five development regions of Nepal
 Election day registration, in the US
 European depositary receipt, represents ownership in the shares of a non-European company that trades in European financial markets
 Economic Demonstrated Resources, Australian index for resources for which profitable extraction or production is possible